Theodore B. Fernald is a linguist and the chair of the Department of Linguistics at Swarthmore College. He is a specialist in semantics and the Navajo language. As of 2012, he was collaborating with Ellavina Perkins under the auspices of Swarthmore and the Navajo Language Academy to produce a reference grammar of Navajo, a project which has received a major grant from the National Endowment for the Humanities. He has also served as vice-chair of the Navajo Language Academy.

References

External links 
 
Works on Microsoft Academic Search

Living people
Linguists from the United States
Swarthmore College faculty
University of California, Santa Cruz alumni
Ohio State University College of Arts and Sciences alumni
Linguists of Navajo
1960 births
Ohio State University Graduate School alumni